Centrinogyna hispidula is a species of flower weevil in the family of beetles known as Curculionidae. It is found in North America. Its range is from Arizona to Mexico.

References

Further reading

 
 

Baridinae
Articles created by Qbugbot
Beetles described in 1920